Dor Peretz (born ) is an Israeli professional footballer who plays as a midfielder for Maccabi Tel Aviv and the Israel national team.

Early life
Peretz was born in Hod HaSharon, Israel, to a family of Sephardic Jewish descent. He also holds a Portuguese passport. His older brother is Israeli footballer Reef Peretz.

Club career

Maccabi Tel Aviv 
On 12 August 2014, Peretz made his senior debut in Maccabi Tel Aviv during a Toto Cup match against Maccabi Netanya. On 10 September 2014, scored his first goal, in a 6–0 victory against Hapoel Petah Tikva. In his first season with the senior team he played 28 games in all competitions.

On 26 September 2015, Peretz scored the first goal in his senior career during a league match against Maccabi Haifa.

Hapoel Haifa 
On 27 January 2017, he moved to Hapoel Haifa on loan until the end of the season.

Venezia 
On 16 June 2021, Peretz signed for three seasons with Italian club Venezia, newly promoted to Serie A. He left Venezia by mutual consent on 5 July 2022.

Return to Maccabi Tel Aviv 
On 15 August 2022, Peretz signed a new three-year contract with Maccabi Tel Aviv.

International career
Peretz played all the youth teams of Israel since the under-16. On 7 June 2015, he made his debut for the Israel U-21 national team in a 4–0 win against Liechtenstein.

In 2015, Peretz was called up by Israel national team head coach Eli Guttman for the senior team. On 11 October 2018, he scored his first goal for the senior Israeli squad in a home match against Scotland at the 2018–19 UEFA Nations League, that ended in a 2–1 win for his native Israel.

Career statistics
Scores and results list Israel's goal tally first, score column indicates score after each Peretz goal.

Honours
Maccabi Tel Aviv
Israeli Premier League: 2014–15, 2018–19, 2019–20
Israel State Cup: 2014–15, 2020–21
Israeli Toto Cup: 2014–15, 2017–18, 2018–19, 2020–21
Israel Super Cup: 2019, 2020

Individual
ONE magazine Player of the Month: December 2016

References

External links
 
 

1995 births
Israeli Sephardi Jews
Portuguese Jews
Living people
Israeli footballers
Portuguese footballers
Citizens of Portugal through descent
Jewish footballers
Association football midfielders
Israel international footballers
Israel under-21 international footballers
Maccabi Tel Aviv F.C. players
Hapoel Haifa F.C. players
Venezia F.C. players
Israeli Premier League players
Serie A players
Israeli expatriate footballers
Portuguese expatriate footballers
Expatriate footballers in Italy
Israeli expatriate sportspeople  in Italy
Portuguese expatriate sportspeople in Italy
Israeli people of Moroccan-Jewish descent
Portuguese people of Moroccan-Jewish descent
Footballers from Hod HaSharon